SS Isaac M. Scott was an American Great Lakes freighter that sank during the Great Lakes Storm of 1913 in Lake Huron,  northeast of Thunder Bay Island, while she was traveling from Cleveland, Ohio, United States to Milwaukee, Wisconsin, United States with a cargo of coal.

She is tied with two other vessels ( and ) for the deadliest shipwreck during the Great Lakes Storm of 1913.

Construction and description 
Isaac M. Scott was built in 1909 at the American Shipbuilding Co. shipyard in Lorain, Ohio, United States and launched on 12 June 1909. She was completed on 2 July 1909. The vessel was named for the president of the La Belle Iron Works, she served from 12 July 1909 until her demise on 11 November 1913. She had a triple-expansion steam engine driving a single screw propeller. At the time of her completion the Toledo Blade called her "One of the handsomest of the large freighters on the great lakes."

Maiden voyage disaster 

Isaac M. Scotts maiden voyage was marred by tragedy. John B. Cowle sank within a few minutes taking 14 of her 24 crewmen with her to the bottom. The survivors were picked up by Isaac M. Scott and taken back to port. Isaac M. Scott suffered damage to about 25 plates, which cost $30,000 in repairs.

In March 1910, the Virginia Steamship Company settled claims filed by relatives of men lost in the sinking of John B. Cowle in the amount of $20,000. Following an investigation and hearings, the United States Steamboat Inspectors at Marquette suspended Captain Rogers of John B. Cowle, as well as its pilot, Edward E. Carlton, for 30 days.  They further ruled that both ships had been sailing too fast for the weather conditions, and that John B. Cowle had failed to properly signal. F. W. Wertheimer, who had been piloting Isaac M. Scott that day, was subsequently beached for one year.

Great Lakes Storm of 1913 and sinking 
In the pre-dawn hours of 9 November 1913, Isaac M. Scott, loaded with a cargo of coal worth $22,000 bound for Milwaukee, Wisconsin, United States left Port Huron, Cleveland, Ohio, United States for the last time. She was one of several big freighters that passed out of the St. Clair River into Lake Huron and straight into the path of the deadliest storm in the Great Lakes history. Captain A. McArthur had been master of Isaac M. Scott since her maiden voyage back in 1909 and sailed with 27 other men on Isaac M. Scotts last voyage.
 
On 9 November 1913 at around 10:30 a.m. H. B. Hawgood was running before the storm when they spotted Isaac M. Scott, still heading north and making heavy weather of it, off Tawas Point, Michigan, just hours before the brunt of the storm struck. When communication was restored and newspapers began carrying accounts of the storm Isaac M. Scott was only listed as missing. The body of Captain McArthur washed up at Southampton, Ontario, Canada on 11 December 1913, still wearing his life preserver. All 28 crew members perished in the disaster.

The sinking of Isaac M. Scott resulted in increased efforts by the U.S. Weather Bureau toward better weather forecasting and more rapid communication of storm warnings.

Isaac M. Scott was one of twelve vessels lost during the Great Lakes Storm of 1913. A storm described in the book Lore of the Lakes, as  "The most disastrous that has ever swept our Great Lakes, both from loss of life and property this unprecedented." The storm of heavy snow, bitter cold winds and frightening high waves took the lives of an estimated 235 mariners, 178 of which were lost on Lake Huron alone.

Wreck 

Isaac M. Scott remained missing for 63 years. Her final resting place is now part of the  Thunder Bay National Marine Sanctuary and Underwater Preserve.

References 

Great Lakes freighters
1909 ships
Maritime incidents in 1913
Shipwrecks of Lake Huron
Ships built in Lorain, Ohio
Ships lost with all hands
Wreck diving sites in the United States